Ballekere is a village near Kadur of Chikkamagaluru district of Karnataka, India.

It is known for being visited by Former Prime Minister Indira Gandhi during her election campaign, where she contested by-election from the Chickmagaluru constituency following Indian emergency. The village now belongs to the Hassan constituency . Every March the religious and cultural event Anjaneya Jatra  Mahothsava is organized by the people of Ballekere.

2011 Census details 

Population
Census Parameter	        Census Data
Total Population	        1157
Total No of Houses	        288
Female Population 	        49.4% ( 572)
Total Literacy rate 	        67.0% ( 775)
Female Literacy rate	        29.2% ( 338)
Scheduled Tribes Population  0.0% ( 0)
Scheduled Caste Population  22.5% ( 260)
Working Population 	        53.6%
Child(0 -6) Population by 2011	81

Ballekere's Local Language is Kannada. Ballekere's total population is 1157, and the number of houses is 288. Females account for 49.4% of the population.

Local governance and amenities

The village is governed by the village panchayat headed by a Sarpanch (Head of Village) along with Panchayti members who are the elected representatives of the village. They are assisted by the local bureaucrats, the PDO and bill collector, who were appointed by the Government of Karnataka.

The village offers a Government-run primary school up to grade 7. Also available is a primary health care centre, located close to the Sri Anjaneya Swami Temple.

Agriculture & Irrigation

The main occupation of the people is agriculture, with the main crops being Ragi, Jowar, Groundnut, and Sunflower. These low water demanding crops are preferred by the farmers, since the farming practice of the area is rainfed agriculture.

Presently there is no irrigation available in the village however; a small reservoir is available in close proximity which is rain-dependent. There are plans to connect this reservoir with Ayyanakere to assist farmers. The area is prone to droughts, as the village is situated geographically in the rain shadow region of the Western Ghats.

Transport

Ballekere is about 7 km away from Kadur. The railway station is located approximately 1 km from the village, where it connects to cities such as Bengaluru, Mysuru, Shimoga, and Hubli.

Languages

The primary local language is Kannada.

Schools in Ballekere

G.h.p.s. Ballekere
Address : ballekere, kadur, chikkamangalore, Karnataka . PIN- 577548, Post - Kadur Town

Government Health Centers near Ballekere

1) Located near Anjaneya Swami Temple.

Cultural rituals 

Traditionally, the village celebrates "Sri Anjaneya Swamy Ratotsava" every year, along with the locally played drama "Sri Shani Mahatme Pouranika Nataka". And also  holi is happening  after the completion of Jatra mahotsava Other vital rituals like "Hanuma Mala" during the Sankranti period, and "Ambu" during the Navarathri period, are also celebrated annually.

See also 
 Ballecer

References 

Villages in Chikkamagaluru district